Frosina is a 1952 Yugoslavian drama film directed by Vojislav Nanović and starring Meri Boskova, Aco Jovanovski and Ljuba Arsova. Produced by the newly-established Vardar Film, it was the first Macedonian language film to be made. Future star Nadja Regin had a small part in the film.

Cast
 Meri Boskova as Frosina 
 Aco Jovanovski as Klime
 Ljuba Arsova as Ljuba
 Ilija Dzuvalekovski as Krste
 Petar Prličko as Kuzman (credited as Petre Prličkov)
 Kiro Vinokic as Leen
 Stojka Cekova as Metijanka
 Boris Beginov as Eftim
 Lidija Debarlieva as Veta
 Kiro Cortosev as Karavil 
 Petar Veljanovski as Jane
 Tomo Vidov as Krste 
 Perica Cvetkovski as Maliot Klime
 Nadja Regin

References

Bibliography 
 Dimitar Bechev. Historical Dictionary of the Republic of Macedonia. Scarecrow Press, 2009.

External links 

1952 films
1952 drama films
Yugoslav drama films
Macedonian-language films
Films directed by Vojislav Nanovic
Films set in North Macedonia
Films set in Yugoslavia
Yugoslav black-and-white films